Christopher A. Crofts (born April 19, 1942) is an American attorney who served as the United States Attorney for the District of Wyoming from 2010 to 2017.

See also
2017 dismissal of U.S. attorneys

References

1942 births
Living people
United States Attorneys for the District of Wyoming
Wyoming Democrats
University of Wyoming alumni
University of Wyoming College of Law alumni
United States Army soldiers
Assistant United States Attorneys
People from Lander, Wyoming
20th-century American lawyers
21st-century American lawyers

Wyoming lawyers